Woodstock is one of the earliest suburbs of Cape Town, South Africa, between the docks of Table Bay and the lower slopes of Devil's Peak, about  east of the city centre of Cape Town. Woodstock is served by Woodstock and Esplanade railway stations, and has the postal code 7925 for street addresses and 7915 for post office box deliveries.

History and geography 
The area was inhabited by Khoikhoi until the arrival of Dutch in the 1600s. Three freehold farms (Zonnebloem, Leliebloem  and Roodebloem) were established on the slopes of Devils Peak in 1692 and as the area became populated it became known as Papendorp - after Pieter van Papendorp, who had settled in the area during the mid-eighteenth century.  By the middle of the 19th century, especially after the arrival of the railway line, Woodstock had become a fashionable seaside suburb with cottages next to the sea and a beach which stretched until the Castle of Good Hope.  In the age of sail a number of violent storms led to many spectacular shipwrecks along the beach. After a brief stint as New Brighton the residents voted in 1867 at the Woodstock Hotel to change the area’s name to Woodstock.

During the 1870s with the subdivision of the old farms for low cost housing, Woodstock began to grow so rapidly that by 1884, less than a year after becoming a separate municipality, Woodstock was the third largest ‘town’ in the country.  Ease of access to the harbour; improved transport; increased industrialisation and a rapidly growing working class population meant that the massive demand for supplies from the British troops during the First and Second Anglo-Boer Wars (1881 and 1899-1902) could be met, and industrial activity flourished, permanently changing the nature of the suburb. Of the industrial activity it is worth noting that the first glass manufactured in South Africa was made at the Woodstock Glass Factory in 1879.

With the massive land reclamation of Table Bay in the 1950s to create the Cape Town foreshore Woodstock beach was lost, and combined with the increasingly industrial nature of the suburb, Woodstock ceased to be a seaside resort.  Woodstock however managed to remain integrated during Apartheid and survived being declared a ‘whites only’ area with the attendant forced removals and demolition of houses as happened in nearby District Six.  As a ‘grey’ area, many coloured and black people started to move into Woodstock during the 1970s and 1980s, laying the foundation for the urban renewal which was to start in the late 1990s.

Urban renewal 
Notwithstanding the lower parts of Woodstock becoming run down in the second half of the 20th century, with litter, crime and drugs becoming a serious issue, the face of Woodstock has changed dramatically over the last decade.  Young professionals have been quick to take advantage of still affordable pretty Victorian semi-detached homes, many of which have been beautifully renovated and restored. Restaurants, media and other businesses, offices, shops and furniture showrooms have sprung up in converted  and revamped warehouses, abandoned buildings and even a disused Castle Brewery.

Places of interest 
 The Treaty Tree is an old milkwood tree in Treaty Road where in 1806 the peace treaty between the English and the Dutch after the Battle of Blaauwberg was signed.  Until 1834 slaves were sold under it and along with convicts also hanged. 
 Woodstock cave is a fairly large but shallow cave (it's more of an overhang) halfway up Devil's Peak 
 The King’s, Queen’s and Prince of Wales’ blockhouses on Devil's Peak.
 The Woodstock Foundry, 160 Albert Road, Woodstock

Education

 Alpha School Learners with Autism
 Mountain Road Primary School
Queen's Park High School
 St Agnes Dominican Convent Primary School

Coat of arms
The Woodstock municipal council adopted a pseudo-heraldic coat of arms, designed by Mr St Vincent Cripps, in February 1892. The shield was divided horizontally, the upper half depicting a sinking sailing ship and the lower half a man on horseback riding into the sea (both evidently referring to Wolraad Woltemade's heroic sea rescue efforts in 1773.  The crest was a dolphin entwined around a crowned anchor;  the supporters were two lions (one upright, the other doing a handstand(!));  and the motto was Per mare per terras.

References

External links

 Upper Woodstock Residents Association
 http://www.ilovewoodstock.co.za
 http://www.capetown.gov.za/en/parks/Pages/TrafalgarPark.aspx
 http://www.theoldbiscuitmill.co.za/
 http://www.oldcastlebrewery.co.za/index.php
 http://www.ruthprowse.co.za/
http://www.woodstockfoundry.co.za/#modern-organic-thai

Suburbs of Cape Town